Toshiba Science Museum is a science museum in Kawasaki, Kanagawa, Japan.  Admission to this museum is free, but reservations are optional if one needs an English speaking guide.

External links
Toshiba Science Museum

Toshiba
Science museums in Japan
Museums in Kanagawa Prefecture
Buildings and structures in Kawasaki, Kanagawa